Rachkov is a Russian male surname, its feminine counterpart is Rachkova. It may refer to
Dimitar Rachkov (born 1972), Bulgarian actor and television host
Konstantin Rachkov (born 1978), Russian rugby union player
Valery Rachkov (born 1956), Soviet Olympic boxer
Tatiana Rachkova (born 1973), Russian figure skater